Un monde nouveau is a 1966 French-Italian drama film directed by Vittorio De Sica. Most notably it featured Sean Connery as himself. Harry Saltzman produced the film.

Plot
A beautiful photographer, Christine Delaroche as Anne, has a love affair with Nino Castelnuovo as Carlo, and becomes pregnant. Carlo wants her to have an abortion and sleeps with a wealthy woman to get money to pay for it, but Ann decides against losing her unborn child.

Cast
 Christine Delaroche as Anne
 Nino Castelnuovo as Carlo
 Madeleine Robinson as Wealthy woman
 Pierre Brasseur as Photographer
 Georges Wilson as Medical professor
 Isa Miranda
 Françoise Brion
 Tanya Lopert as Mary
 Jeanne Aubert
 Jean-Pierre Darras
 Franco Bucceri
 Antoine De Rudder
 Arlette Gilbert
 Paul Mercey
 Charles Millot
 Laure Paillette
 Nadeige Ragoo as Judith
 Sean Connery as playing Himself (uncredited): "Carlo" tries getting a photo of Connery at the Paris premiere of Goldfinger

References

External links

1966 films
Italian drama films
1960s French-language films
1966 drama films
French black-and-white films
Films directed by Vittorio De Sica
Films with screenplays by Cesare Zavattini
1960s French films
1960s Italian films